Pan European Networks (PEN) is a marketing company. They try to convince people that "publishing" with them is a way to reach European science leadership. This however appears to be untrue and it is regarded as a non-credible source. They started in 2012 and have offices in the United Kingdom and Brussels.

Operations
The organization is known for making calls to researchers offering to publish their work but requesting an immediate commitment. Initial proposed charges are around 10,000 USD for a publication but this appears to be negotiable. Their persistence has been described as harassment by Uppsala University. They have also threatened to sue those who criticize them. They published a magazine called Scitech Europa Quarterly and Health Europa Quarterly among others.

History
The company is owned by Darren Wilson.

See also

Predatory journal
Vanity press

References

Marketing companies